The 2015–16 CONCACAF Champions League group stage was played from August 4 to October 22, 2015. A total of 24 teams competed in the group stage to decide the eight places in the knockout stage of the 2015–16 CONCACAF Champions League.

Draw

The draw for the tournament was held on June 1, 2015, 20:00 EDT (UTC−4), at the New World Center in Miami Beach, Florida. The 24 teams were drawn into eight groups of three, with each group containing one team from each of the three pots.

For the draw, the 24 teams were seeded into three pots. Teams from the same association (excluding "wildcard" teams which replace a team from another association) were placed in the same pot such that they could not be drawn into the same group:
Pot 1 contained two teams from El Salvador, one team each from Canada, Nicaragua, and Belize, and three teams from the Caribbean.
Pot 2 contained two teams each from Costa Rica, Honduras, Guatemala, and Panama.
Pot 3 contained four teams each from Mexico and the United States.

The seeding was changed from previous seasons where teams from the same association were placed in different pots.

Format

In the group stage, each group was played on a home-and-away round-robin basis. The winners of each group advanced to the quarterfinals.

Tiebreakers

The teams were ranked according to points (3 points for a win, 1 point for a draw, 0 points for a loss). If tied on points, tiebreakers would be applied in the following order (Regulations, II. C. Tie-Breaker Procedures):
Greater number of points earned in matches between the teams concerned;
Greater goal difference in matches between the teams concerned;
Greater number of goals scored away from home in matches between the teams concerned;
Greater goal difference in all group matches;
Greater number of goals scored in group matches;
Greater number of goals scored away in all group matches;
Drawing of lots.

Groups
The matchdays were August 4–6, August 18–20, August 25–27, September 15–17, September 22–24, and October 20–22, 2015.

All times U.S. Eastern Daylight Time (UTC−4)

Group A

Group B

Group C

Group D

Group E

Group F

Group G

Group H

References

External links
CONCACAF Champions League , CONCACAF.com

2